The Dallara SF23 is an open-wheel single-seater chassis produced by Dallara for use in the Japanese Super Formula Championship. It is set to debut in 2023, replacing the Dallara SF19 chassis. It will be the main chassis used in Super Formula.

History 
The single-seater SF23 was presented on December 13, 2022. The car was developed through seven test sessions, covering .

Specifications 
Compared to its predecessor, the SF23 has important aerodynamic differences in order to guarantee a greater possibility of overtaking. The ailerons, bellies and bottom are modified. Like the SF19 it will be equipped with engines supplied by Honda or Toyota.

For some components of the bodywork, materials derived from flax fiber, cork and recycled carbon fiber are used. This allows for a 75% reduction in carbon dioxide emissions in the production process.

References

SF23
Open wheel racing cars
Super Formula cars